Cabela's African Safari is a 2006 hunting simulation video game played from a third-person perspective. It was released for Microsoft Windows, PlayStation 2, PlayStation Portable and Xbox 360.

Gameplay 
The player can track and stalk a variety of animals on a safari over five or six African countries (depending on the version). Animals include leopards, elephants, rhinoceroses, cheetahs, cape buffalo, lions, and many others.

Release 
The game was published by Activision Value, in conjunction with hunting supply company Cabela's. It was the second Cabela's game to be released on the Xbox 360 and third on the PSP.

Critical reception 
Xbox Achievements thought the game was decent but did not try to push the genre or the series in any meaningful way. IGN felt that the PC and PS2 versions were better than the Xbox 360 version, which was severely lacking.

References

External links 
 

2006 video games
Cabela's video games
First-person shooters
Windows games
Xbox 360 games
PlayStation 2 games
PlayStation Portable games
Activision games
Video games set in Botswana
Video games set in Mozambique
Video games set in Namibia
Video games set in South Africa
Video games set in Tanzania
Video games set in Zimbabwe
Multiplayer and single-player video games
Video games developed in Romania
Fun Labs games
Sand Grain Studios games
Magic Wand Productions games